In four-dimensional Euclidean geometry, the truncated tesseractic honeycomb is a uniform  space-filling tessellation (or honeycomb) in Euclidean 4-space. It is constructed by a truncation of a tesseractic honeycomb creating truncated tesseracts, and adding new 16-cell facets at the original vertices.

Related honeycombs

See also 
Regular and uniform honeycombs in 4-space:
Tesseractic honeycomb
Demitesseractic honeycomb
24-cell honeycomb
Truncated 24-cell honeycomb
Snub 24-cell honeycomb
 5-cell honeycomb
 Truncated 5-cell honeycomb
 Omnitruncated 5-cell honeycomb

Notes

References 
 Kaleidoscopes: Selected Writings of H.S.M. Coxeter, edited by F. Arthur Sherk, Peter McMullen, Anthony C. Thompson, Asia Ivic Weiss, Wiley-Interscience Publication, 1995,  
 (Paper 24) H.S.M. Coxeter, Regular and Semi-Regular Polytopes III, [Math. Zeit. 200 (1988) 3-45] See p318 
 George Olshevsky, Uniform Panoploid Tetracombs, Manuscript (2006) (Complete list of 11 convex uniform tilings, 28 convex uniform honeycombs, and 143 convex uniform tetracombs)
  o3o3o *b3x4x, x4x3o3o4o - tattit - O89
 

5-polytopes
Honeycombs (geometry)
Truncated tilings